Mateiros is the easternmost city in the state of Tocantins. It is the only city in Tocantins to border the state of Piauí

The municipality is in the microregion of Jalapão.

Conservation

The municipality contains part of the  Serra Geral do Tocantins Ecological Station, a strictly protected conservation unit created in 2001 to preserve an area of cerrado.
It contains part of the  Nascentes do Rio Parnaíba National Park, created in 2002.
It also contains the  Jalapão State Park, a fully protected conservation unit created in 2001.

References 

Municipalities in Tocantins
Populated places established in 1992